The 2021–22 Croatian Handball Premier League (known as the Paket24 Premijer liga for sponsorship reasons) was the 30th season of the Premier League, Croatian premier handball league. It ran from 10 September 2021 to 29 May 2022.

PPD Zagreb won their thirtieth title.

Teams

Arenas and locations
The following 16 clubs compete in the Premier League during the 2021–22 season:

Regular season

League A

League B

Second round

Championship round
The top eight teams from the regular season play in the relegation round. Teams play each other once.

League table

Relegation round
The bottom eight teams from the regular season play in the relegation round. Teams play each other once.

League table

Playoffs

Finals

PPD Zagreb won the Final series 6–2 with points ratio.

Third place series

Sesvete won the Third place series 7–3 with points ratio.

Promotion/relegation play-offs
Two legged relegation play-off matches will be played between the teams placed 13th and 14th at the end of relegation round and the teams placed 2nd at the end of Croatian First League North and South Division.

|}

Final standings

See also
 2021–22 Croatian Cup

References

External links
Croatian Handball Federation 

Croatian Premier Handball League seasons
Croatia
Handball
Handball